"Acts of Terror" is the forty-sixth episode and the eleventh episode of the third season (1988–89) of the television series The Twilight Zone. In this episode, a housewife's anger at her husband manifests itself as a viscous Doberman Pinscher.

Plot
Louise Simonson is a doting housewife to her tyrannical and abusive husband Jack. She receives a package from her sister: a sculpture of a Doberman Pinscher, a belated birthday present.

When Jack leaves on a fishing trip, Louise cradles the Doberman sculpture, and a real Doberman appears outside Jack's automobile and barks angrily at him. Louise has her sister Claire over. Claire is aware that Jack beats Louise and says she should leave him, but Louise says it is not his fault.

After Jack returns from his fishing trip, he and Louise host a dinner party with Claire and her husband Phil. Jack takes Phil into the garage and asks him to lie to support his "fishing trip" story, which is actually a cover for an affair Jack is having with a woman named Denise. Louise overhears. The Doberman appears in the garage and barks at Jack again. He shoots at it with a shotgun, but it vanishes. Since only Jack saw the dog, the police are skeptical of his story, and even berate him for firing his shotgun.

Louise confronts Jack about his extramarital affair. The dog appears inside the house, and everywhere Jack tries to go he runs into another Doberman. Sobbing, Louise tells Jack that  her anger at him made the dog appear, and she can no longer make it go away because she does not love him anymore. Jack tries breaking the sculpture, but the dog does not vanish, and finally attacks Jack. Fearing for Jack's life, Louise finds the will to command the dog to stop attacking, then stand at attention and disappear.

Louise leaves Jack. A still injured Jack says he will come after her if she leaves, but she confidently answers, "No, you won't." The dog briefly appears in the front passenger seat and snarls at Jack. She drives away, leaving the viewer to decide whether this last appearance of the Doberman is simply a manifestation of Jack's fear or Louise can now manifest the Doberman at will.

External links
 

1988 American television episodes
The Twilight Zone (1985 TV series season 3) episodes

fr:Légitime Défense (La Cinquième Dimension)